Arunee Nanthiwat is a Thai voice actress who has been works for Channel 9, TIGA, and Dream Express (DEX).

Arunee's major roles include Suneo Honekawa in Doraemon, Conan Edogawa, Sonoko Suzuki in Detective Conan in 1999–2021, Nico Robin, and Tony Tony Chopper In One Piece. She won the TV Gold Award in 1995 for Best Actress for the role of Hagemaru Hageda in Tsurupika Hagemaru.

On 28 August 2021, Arunee announced her indefinite hiatus from voice acting career as the COVID-19 pandemic hit the Thailand. Quarantine rules and her works were cancelled. In August 2022, she has returned to the voice acting career by dubbing the One Piece Film: Red and Doraemon: Nobita's Little Star Wars 2021.

Filmography

Voice over roles

Anime dubbing
 Zatch Bell! - Gash Bell, Zofis
 Doraemon - Suneo
 Dr. Slump (Channel 9 dub) - Akane Kimidori
 Dragon Ball (Channel 9 dub) - Chi-Chi, Puar, Yajirobe
 Dragon Ball Z (Channel 9 dub) - Android #18, Chi-Chi, Dende
 Cardcaptor Sakura (Channel 9 dub) - Syaoran Li
 Pygmalio - Medusa
 City Hunter (Channel 9 dub) - Saeko Nogami, Reika Nogami
 Ghost Sweeper Mikami (Channel 9 dub) - Reiko Mikami
 Revolutionary Girl Utena (Channel 9 dub) - Juri Arisugawa
 Sailor Moon (Channel 9 dub) - Rei Hino (Sailor Mars), Makoto Kino (Sailor Jupiter)
 YuYu Hakusho - Botan, Shizuru Kuwabara, Mukuro
 Powerpuff Girls Z (Channel 9 dub) - Kaoru Matsubara (Powered Buttercup)
 Mobile Suit Gundam Wing (Channel 9 dub) - Lucrezia Noin, Dorothy Catalonia
 Tsurupika Hagemaru - Hagemaru Hageda
 Tokyo Mew Mew (Channel 9 dub) - Zakuro Fujiwara
 Magic Knight Rayearth (Channel 9 dub) - Umi Ryuuzaki
 Magical DoReMi - Hazuki Fujiwara, Majo Rika
 Yaiba - Yaiba Kurogane, Kaguya (ep.34-38)
 Hunter × Hunter (Channel 9 dub) - Gon Freecss
 Glass Mask (Channel 9 dub) - Ayumi Himekawa
 Inuyasha - Shippo, Kagura
 You're Under Arrest - Natsumi Tsujimoto
 Ranma ½ (Channel 9 dub) - Ranma Saotome (Female)
 Fairy Tail (Channel 9 dub) - Erza Scarlet, Cana Alberona, Aquarius
 Fruits Basket -  Kagura Sohma
 Dragon Ball - Son Goku (Child)
 Detective Conan - Conan Edogawa, Sonoko Suzuki, Eri Kisaki
 High School of the Dead - Saeko Busujima, Rika Minami, Yuriko Takagi
 Girls und Panzer - Ami Chōno, Mako Reizei 
 Neon Genesis Evangelion - Asuka Langley Soryu, Ritsuko Akagi
 Nadia: The Secret of Blue Water - Grandis Granva
 Mobile Suit Gundam Wing - Duo Maxwell
 Mobile Suit Gundam SEED - Natarle Badgiruel, Flay Allster
 Mobile Suit Gundam SEED Destiny - Talia Gladys, Lunamaria Hawke
 Tiger & Bunny - Agnes Joubert
 Hikaru no Go - Yoshitaka Waya
 InuYasha - Shippo, Kagura
 Code Geass - Kallen Stadtfeld, Cornelia li Britannia, Lelouch Lamperouge (Child),  Rolo, Marianne vi Britannia, Sayoko Shinozaki, Milly Ashford
 Fullmetal Alchemist - Sheska, Riza Hawkeye, Rosé
 Sakura Wars - Li Kohran, Maria Tachibana
 Bakugan Battle Brawlers - Daniel "Dan" Kuso
 Shin Mazinger Shougeki! Z Hen - Baron Ashura (Female side), Shiro Kabuto, Kikunosuke 
 The Prince of Tennis - Sakuno Ryuzaki
 My-HiME - Natsuki Kuga, Alyssa Searrs, Nagi Homura
 My-Otome - Nina Wáng, Natsuki Kruger, Nagi Dài Artai
 Fate/stay night - Rin Tōsaka, Caster, Mitsuzuri Ayako
 Magical Girl Lyrical Nanoha - Yūno Scrya
 Sgt. Frog - Sergeant Keroro (ep. 1 to 205)
 Kannazuki no Miko - Sister Miyako, Makoto Saotome, Sōma Ōgami (Child)
 Great Teacher Onizuka - Ryoko Sakurai, Urumi Kanzaki
 Cyborg Kuro-chan - Mi, The Crows, Some of cats
 Yu-Gi-Oh! Duel Monsters - Mai Kujaku
 Burst Angel - Jo
 Love Hina -  Motoko Aoyama, Haruka Urashima
 Tsubasa Chronicle - Syaoran
 Battle Spirits: Shōnen Toppa Bashin - Toppa Bashin
 Battle Spirits: Shōnen Gekiha Dan - Mai Viole, Kenzo Hyoudo

Tokusatsu dubbing
 Ultraman Gaia - Atsuko Sasaki

Film dubbing 
 Harry Potter and the Order of the Phoenix - Dolores Umbridge (Imelda Staunton)

TV program dubbing 
 Sponge (Channel 9 dub)

References

1956 births
Living people
Arunee Nanthiwat
Arunee Nanthiwat